This is a list of Maltese football transfers for the 2008-09 winter transfer window by club. Only transfers of the Maltese Premier League are included.

The winter transfer window opened on 1 January 2009, although a few transfers may take place prior to that date. The window closed at midnight on 31 January 2009. Players without a club may join one at any time, either during or in between transfer windows.

The transfer window was concluded on 31 January 2009. The big movers being Roderick Briffa who swapped Sliema Wanderers for current champions Valletta, also joining Valletta were Brazilian striker Paulo Massaro and returning was Argentina striker Omar Sebastián Monesterolo, who had left the club in the summer. Departing the club on a temporary basis were defender Jonathan Bondin who teamed up with Ħamrun Spartans} on loan for the remainder of the season and midfielder David Camilleri who also went on loan for the remainder of the season to Tarxien Rainbows.

Marsaxlokk made an effort to strengthen their team with the signings of Chris Camilleri from Msida Saint-Joseph and Dylan Kokavessis from Ħamrun Spartans. The only outgoing player was Stephen Wellman who joined Qormi.

Player Transfers

Birkirkara

In:

 
 
 

Out:

Floriana

In:

Out:

Ħamrun Spartans

In:

 

 

Out:

Hibernians

In:

Out:

Marsaxlokk

In:

Out:

Msida Saint-Joseph

In:

Out:

Qormi

In:

Out:

Sliema Wanderers

In:

Out:

Tarxien Rainbows

In:

Out:

Valletta

In:

 
 
 

Out:

Manager Transfers

See also
 List of Belgian football transfers winter 2008–09
 List of Cypriot football transfers winter 2008–09
 List of Danish football transfers winter 2008-09
 List of Dutch football transfers winter 2008-09
 List of English football transfers winter 2008-09
 List of German football transfers winter 2008–09
 List of Italian football transfers winter 2008–09
 List of Spanish football transfers winter 2008-09

References

External links
 Official Website

Transfers Winter 2008-09|Transfers
Maltese
2008–09